Charter Hall is an Australian property development and funds management company. In 2022, IREI ranked Charter Hall as the largest real estate investment manager in Australasia based on assets under management.

History 
Charter Hall was founded in 1991 by André Biet, David Southon and Cedric Fuchs. Biet left in 2005 when the company listed, Southon left in 2016 and Fuch retired in 2018. 

In 2004, Transfield Holdings acquired  a 50% stake of Charter Hall. In the same year David Harrison joined the company and is now leading it as Group CEO.

On June 2005, the company held an initial public offering to list on the Australian Securities Exchange.

In 2010, the company acquired Macquarie Group’s real estate platform.

On November 2016, Charter Hall Long WALE REIT listed on Australian Securities Exchange which at the time was the largest ever initial public offering for a diversified property trust in the Australian market.

On August 2018, Charter Hall acquired rival Folkestone in a $205 million cash deal.

In 2021, Charter Hall acquired a 50% stake in Paradice Investment Management for $207 million.

Properties 
Virtually all investments are based in Australasia.

 555 Collins Street
 Bass Hill Plaza
 Brisbane Administration Centre
 Brisbane Square Tower 2
 Citigroup Centre
 Pacific Square
 Rockdale Plaza

References

External links 

Australian companies established in 1991
Companies listed on the Australian Securities Exchange
Financial services companies based in Sydney
Financial services companies established in 1991
Investment companies of Australia
Real estate companies of Australia